CYSJ may refer to:

Canadian Young Scientist Journal
Saint John Airport, ICAO code